Saint Leger or Saint-Léger may refer to:

People 
 Leodegar (615–679), martyred Burgundian Bishop of Autun
 Saint-Léger Didot (1767–1828), French papermaker
 St. Leger family, an Anglo-Irish family
 Anne St Leger (1476–1526), Baroness de Ros, niece of Edward IV and Richard III
 Anthony St Leger (British Army officer) (1731–1786/32–1786), Member of Parliament
 Anthony St Leger (Lord Deputy of Ireland) (1496–1559), English politician and Lord Deputy of Ireland
 Anthony St Leger (Master of the Rolls) (died 1613), English-born judge
 Barry St. Leger (1733–1789), British army officer
 Barthélemy Mercier de Saint-Léger (1734–1799), French abbot and librarian
 The Honorable Elizabeth Aldworth, born the Hon. Elizabeth St Leger, first Irish woman to be initiated as a Freemason
 Francis Saint-Léger (born 1957), member of the National Assembly of France
 Frank St. Leger (1890–1969),  British-American symphony conductor of Indian birth
 Frederick York St Leger (1833–1901), South African newspaperman and Anglican rector
 Garry St. Leger (born 1985), American judoka
 John St. Leger (died 1596) (died 1596), English Member of Parliament
 Nicholas St. Leger (died 1589), English politician
 Raymond St. Leger (born 1957), American mycologist, entomologist and molecular biologist
 Sean St Ledger (born 1984), English footballer
 St Leger St Leger, 1st Viscount Doneraile (died 1787), Irish Member of Parliament for Doneraile
 Thomas St. Leger (died 1483), English civil servant and rebel
 Warham St Leger (1525–1597), English soldier
 Will St Leger (born 1972), Irish street artist
 William St Leger (1586–1642), Anglo-Irish landowner, official and soldier

Places

Belgium
Saint-Léger, Belgium, in Luxembourg province
Saint-Léger, Estaimpuis, in Hainaut

France
Saint-Léger, Alpes-Maritimes, in the Alpes-Maritimes department 
Saint-Léger, Charente, in the Charente department
Saint-Léger, Charente-Maritime, in the Charente-Maritime department 
Saint-Léger, Lot-et-Garonne, in the Lot-et-Garonne department
Saint-Léger, Mayenne, in the Mayenne department 
Saint-Léger, Pas-de-Calais, in the Pas-de-Calais department 
Saint-Léger, Savoie, in the Savoie department 
Saint-Léger, Seine-et-Marne, in the Seine-et-Marne department 
Saint-Léger, former commune in the Manche department that is now part of Saint-Jean-des-Champs
Saint-Léger-aux-Bois, Oise, in the Oise department 
Saint-Léger-aux-Bois, Seine-Maritime, in the Seine-Maritime department 
Saint-Léger-Bridereix, in the Creuse department
Saint-Léger-de-Balson, in the Gironde department
Saint-Léger-de-Fougeret, in the Nièvre department
Saint-Léger-de-la-Martinière, in the Deux-Sèvres department
Saint-Léger-de-Montbrillais, in the Vienne department
Saint-Léger-de-Montbrun, in the Deux-Sèvres department
Saint-Léger-de-Peyre, in the Lozère department
Saint-Léger-de-Rôtes, in the Eure department
Saint-Léger-des-Aubées, in the Eure-et-Loir department
Saint-Léger-des-Bois, in the Maine-et-Loire department
Saint-Léger-des-Prés, in the Ille-et-Vilaine department
Saint-Léger-des-Vignes, in the Nièvre department
Saint-Léger-du-Bois, in the Saône-et-Loire department
Saint-Léger-Dubosq, in the Calvados department
Saint-Léger-du-Bourg-Denis, in the Seine-Maritime department
Saint-Léger-du-Gennetey, in the Eure department
Saint-Léger-du-Malzieu, in the Lozère department
Saint-Léger-du-Ventoux, in the Vaucluse department
Saint-Léger-en-Bray, in the Oise department
Saint-Léger-en-Yvelines, in the Yvelines department
Saint-Léger-la-Montagne, in the Haute-Vienne department
Saint-Léger-le-Guérétois, in the Creuse department
Saint-Léger-le-Petit, in the Cher department
Saint-Léger-lès-Authie, in the Somme department
Saint-Léger-lès-Domart, in the Somme department
Saint-Léger-les-Mélèzes, in the Hautes-Alpes department
Saint-Léger-lès-Paray, in the Saône-et-Loire department
Saint-Léger-les-Vignes, in the Loire department
Saint-Léger-Magnazeix, in the Haute-Vienne department
Saint-Léger-près-Troyes, in the Aube department
Saint-Léger-sous-Beuvray, in the Saône-et-Loire department
Saint-Léger-sous-Brienne, in the Aube department
Saint-Léger-sous-Cholet, in the Maine-et-Loire department
Saint-Léger-sous-la-Bussière, in the Saône-et-Loire department
Saint-Léger-sous-Margerie, in the Aube department
Saint-Léger-sur-Bresle, in the Somme department
Saint-Léger-sur-Dheune, in the Saône-et-Loire department
Saint-Léger-sur-Roanne, in the Loire department
Saint-Léger-sur-Sarthe, in the Orne department
Saint-Léger-sur-Vouzance, in the Allier department
Saint-Léger-Triey, in the Côte-d'Or  department
Saint-Léger-Vauban, in the Yonne department

Switzerland
Saint-Légier-La Chiésaz, a municipality in the district of Riviera-Pays-d'Enhaut in the canton of Vaud

Greyhound racing
 St Leger (greyhounds), a British greyhound race
 St Leger (Irish greyhounds), an Irish greyhound race
 Yorkshire St Leger, a British greyhound race

Horse racing
 American St. Leger Stakes, an American horse race
 Deutsches St. Leger, a German horse race
 Great Northern St. Leger, a New Zealand horse race
 Irish St. Leger, an Irish horse race
 New Zealand St. Leger, a New Zealand horse race
 St Leger Stakes, a British horse race
 St. Leger Italiano, an Italian horse race
 VRC St Leger, an Australian horse race